The lumbosacral trunk is nervous tissue that connects the lumbar plexus with the sacral plexus.

Structure
The lumbosacral trunk comprises the whole of the ventral rami of L5 and a part of L4. It appears at the medial margin of the psoas major and runs downward over the pelvic brim to join the first sacral nerve.

The anterior division of the third sacral nerve divides into an upper and a lower branch, the former entering the sacral plexus and the latter the pudendal plexus. This connects the lumbar plexus and the sacral plexus.

Clinical significance 
The lumbosacral trunk may be compressed by the fetal head during the second stage of labour. This causes some muscle weakness in the legs. A full recovery is usually expected.

Additional images

Reference

External links
  - "The Female Pelvis: The Posterolateral Pelvic Wall"
 
 

Spinal nerves